The gaze heuristic is a heuristic used in directing correct motion to achieve a goal using one main variable. An example of the gaze heuristic is catching a ball. The gaze heuristic is one example of psychologist Gerd Gigerenzer's one good reason heuristic, where human animals and non-human animals are able to process large amounts of information quickly and react, regardless of whether the information is consciously processed.

The gaze heuristic is a critical element in animal behavior, being used in predation heavily. At the most basic level, the gaze heuristic ignores all casual relevant variables to make quick gut reactions.

Example

A catcher using the gaze heuristic observes the initial angle of the ball and runs towards it in such a way as to keep this angle constant.  Experimental studies have shown that if people ignore the fact they were solving a system of differential equations to catch the ball, and simply follow the gaze heuristic they will consistently arrive in the exact spot the ball is predicted to hit the ground. The gaze heuristic does not require knowledge of any of the variables required by the optimizing approach, nor does it require the catcher to integrate information, yet it allows the catcher to successfully catch the ball. The gaze heuristic may therefore be described at ecologically rational at least in the simple case of catching a ball in the air.

References

Heuristics